Juan Pacheco, 1st Duke of Escalona (1419 – 1 October 1474), better known as Juan Pacheco, Marquess of Villena, was a Castilian noble of Portuguese descent who rose to power in the last years of the reign of Juan II of Castile and came to dominate the government of Castile during the reign of Juan II’s son and successor Henry IV of Castile. Created The 1st Duke of Escalona in 1472, his other titles included, among others, Marquess of Villena and Master of the Order of Santiago.

Biography
Juan Pacheco was the son of Alfonso Téllez Girón y Vázquez de Acuña, and María Pacheco (the daughter of Juan Fernández Pacheco, first lord of Belmonte, and Agnes Téllez de Meneses). The family, of Portuguese nobility, had been exiled to Castile after the battle of Aljubarrota (1385), and counted, among its main possessions in Belmonte, the Alcázar, built by Prince Don Juan Manuel, and later the Castle of Belmonte, built by Pacheco in 1456 after becoming Marquess of Villena. The close relationship of the Pacheco family and the Castilian Crown is evidenced, for example, in the fact that Pacheco's childhood playmate was Henry IV of Castile. In his youth, he served as a page to Àlvaro de Luna, who later brought him to court to serve Prince Henry.

Pacheco became the prince's confidant, and this friendship would continue when his master became king Henry IV of Castile. Pacheco intervened in major political decisions. In January 1442, aged 22, he had reached the office of chamberlain of the prince, the highest position in the house of the heir after the steward, a dignity still in the hands of the constable Álvaro de Luna. That same year he joined the lordship of Moguer via his marriage to María Portocarrero, who had an important legacy, which was later lost.

Pacheco was created The Marquess of Villena (Spanish: El Marqués de Villena), the first title of marquess conferred by a Castilian monarch, in 1445 after the first Battle of Olmedo. He negotiated the title of Master of the Order of Calatrava for his brother, Pedro Girón. In the conflict that arose soon after between King John II of Castile and Prince Henry, Pacheco mediated on behalf of the prince, taking Álvaro de Luna as a mediator for the king. The agreement would benefit both mediators.

Other titles earned by Pacheco would include Adelantado of Castile from 1451 to 1456, and of Merino Mayor of Asturias from 1461 to 1462. He was also made Master of the Order of Santiago in 1467 by Prince Alfonso, who had been proclaimed king by some Castilian nobles in the Farce of Ávila.

In 1463, in Bayonne, Pacheco offered his services to France. With this alliance, France encircled its enemy, the kingdom of Aragón. In gratitude, Louis XI promised the hand of his daughter, Joanna, to the youngest son of Pacheco, Pedro de Portocarrero. The Aragonese king's reaction was to win the friendship of Castile and void the Castilian-French alliance, promising his son Fernando to Pacheco's daughter, Beatriz.

In 1466, Pacheco's nephew, Rodrigo Téllez Girón, was elected Master of the Order of Calatrava. Being a minor, Pacheco would be his tutor, giving him the post of coadjutor of the order in 1469. As such, he would have the same powers as the masters had, except in spiritual matters, which should be delegated to persons belonging to the order. Writers of the period claimed he was Master of Calatrava, in addition to Master of Santiago.

In 1469, Princess Isabella, half-sister of Henry IV, married Ferdinand of Aragón, against the will of the king and overriding prior diplomatic agreements, starting thus the War of the Castilian Succession, in which Pacheco supported Princess Juana, Henry IV's daughter. Pacheco died on 4 October 1474, in Santa Cruz, near Trujillo, shortly before the death of King Henry IV, of a throat ailment. Before dying, King Henry confirmed Pacheco's son, Diego López Pacheco, as Marquess of Villena. The surname: 'Pacheco' is cited as: 'Pacieco', in the Julius Caesar's chronicle of Spanish war as 'a man very popular in the region'.

Nuptials and offspring
Don Juan, 1st Duke of Escalona, Grandee of Castile, married three times. His first wife was Angelina de Luna, cousin of the constable Álvaro de Luna. The marriage was nullified in 1442. Soon after, he married María Enríquez Portocarrero (d. 1470), daughter of Pedro (Martín Fernández) Portocarrero y Cabeza de Vaca, the fifth Lord of Moguer, and Beatriz Enriquez, daughter of Alonso de Mendoza and Juana Enríquez. María thus became, in 1445, Marchioness of Villena. The canonical marriage was valid until 1456, when Pope Callistus III authorised the marriage by the church and the legitimation of children born up to that date.

The children of this marriage were:
 Diego López Pacheco y Portocarrero, who succeeded his father to become The 2nd Duke of Escalona as well as succeeding his father in all his other hereditary titles and status.
 Pedro de Portocarrero, who inherited the lordship of Moguer and Villanueva del Fresno of his maternal family.
 Francisca de Pacheco, wife of Íñigo López de Mendoza y Quiñones el Gran Tendilla
 Beatriz Pacheco, married c. 1490 Rodrigo Ponce de León, Marquess of Cádiz
 Maria de Pacheco, wife of Rodrigo Alonso Pimentel IV, Count and Duke of Benavente
 Luis de Pacheco
 Lope de Pacheco
 Juana de Pacheco

After the death of María Enríquez, Marchioness of Villena, Juan Pacheco married María de Velasco, daughter of Pedro Fernández de Velasco y Manrique de Lara, and Mencia de Mendoza y Figueroa. A daughter was born of this marriage:
Mencia Pacheco, who married Diego de Cardenas Enríquez, Duke of Maqueda I. 

Juan Pacheco had several children out of wedlock. He had two children with Catalina Alonso Urueña: Juan and Isabel Pacheco. They were legitimized on 25 April 1456, by King Henry IV of Castile: By an unknown woman, he fathered Alonso, Rodrigo, Beatriz, and Leonor.

See also
Pedro de Portocarrero (conquistador)

Notes

Bibliography
BERWICK, and Duchess of Alba, "Catálogo de las colecciones expuestas en las vitrinas del Palacio de Liria" (1898)
CIUDAD Ruiz, Manuel, "El maestrazgo de Don Rodrigo Tellez Giron" (2000), in La España Medieval (23), ISSN 0214-3038, pp. 321–65
FRANCO SILVA, Alfonso, "Juan Pacheco: De doncel del príncipe de Asturias a Marqués de Villena (1440–1445)", 2009, Anuario de Estudios Medievales, 39/2, ISSN 0066-5061, pp. 723–75 
MARINO, Nancy F., Don Juan Pacheco. Wealth and Power in Late Medieval Spain (2006), Tempe, AZ: Arizona Center for Medieval and Renaissance Studies; 
MARTIN José Luis, Enríque IV, 2003, Hondarribia: Nerea, pp. 46–55, 80
DEL PULGAR, Fernando, Los claros varones d'Spaña, Series: Clássicos Castellanos London (1971); ASIN: B00UICG4HI, pp 41–46 (F. XVII-XIX)NOTE: Facsimile of the edition of Stanislaus Polono, made in Seville in 1500.
SALAZAR Y ACHA, Jaime de, La casa del Rey de Castilla y León en la Edad Media, 1st ed., Madrid (2000); 
SUAREZ FERNANDEZ, Luis, Enríque IV de Castilla: La difamación como arma política, Barcelona: Ariel (2001); 

1419 births
1474 deaths
Spanish people of Portuguese descent
Spanish politicians
Counts of Spain
Dukes of Escalona
Marquesses of Villena
Grand Masters of the Order of Santiago